Spencer Whipple (born March 18, 1989) is an American football coach who is the pass game specialist for the Arizona Cardinals of the National Football League (NFL). He previously coached five seasons at UMass.

Early life
Spencer Whipple is the son of former UMass head coach, former Pittsburgh offensive coordinator Mark Whipple and current Offensive coordinator for the Nebraska Cornhuskers. Spencer attended Pine-Richland High School (Pa.). During his senior season, he threw for nearly 1,500 and 11 touchdowns. He helped lead the Pine-Richland High School Rams to 11-1 record and subsequent Greater Allegheny Conference Championship.

Playing career 
In 2007, Spencer Whipple made the Pittsburgh team as a walk-on quarterback. He then spent the 2008 season at UMass with the Minutemen. In 2009, Spencer transferred to Miami where his father, Mark Whipple was the offensive coordinator.  As the team's holder and backup quarterback, Whipple played in each game at Miami in 2010 and 2011. In 2011, his senior season, Whipple received the Mariutto Family Scholar-Athlete Award. That season, as the team's holder, he helped lead the Hurricanes to a perfect 39-for-39 on PAT attempts, as well as 11-for-14 on field goals.

Coaching career

Pittsburgh
In 2012 Whipple joined Pittsburgh as a defensive graduate assistant and video assistant under head coach Paul Chryst.

UMass
In 2014, Spencer Whipple was hired as the tight ends coach for UMass. Spencer joined his father Mark Whipple, who was starting his second stint as head coach at UMass. In 2015, Spencer was named wide receivers coach, a position he held through the 2017 season. On February 5, 2018, Spencer Whipple was promoted to passing game coordinator and quarterbacks coach.

Arizona Cardinals
On February 6, 2019, Whipple was hired by the Arizona Cardinals as an offensive quality control coach under head coach Kliff Kingsbury. On February 5, 2020, Whipple was promoted to assistant wide receivers coach. On May 10, 2022, Whipple was promoted to co–pass game coordinator along with Cameron Turner.

References

External links
 Arizona Cardinals bio

1989 births
Living people
American football quarterbacks
Arizona Cardinals coaches
UMass Minutemen football coaches
 UMass Minutemen  football players
Miami Hurricanes football players
 Pittsburgh Panthers football players
Pittsburgh Panthers football coaches
Players of American football from Pennsylvania